Riviera Broadcast Group is an owner and operator of three radio stations in the Phoenix market. The company was founded in January 2005 by Tim Pohlman, a former executive with CBS Radio, and partner Chris Maguire, who serves as the company's chief financial officer. Corporate offices are in Las Vegas.

Stations 
 KKFR Phoenix, branded as "Power 98.3", Rhythmic Contemporary Hit Radio format (acquired in 2006 from Emmis Communications)
 KZON/KMVA Phoenix, branded as "Hit 97.5/103.9", Hot AC format
 KOAI Phoenix, branded as "95.1 & 94.9 The Oasis", Soft adult contemporary format

References

External links 
 

Radio broadcasting companies of the United States
Privately held companies based in the Las Vegas Valley